Celtic Football Club is a professional association football club based Glasgow, Scotland. The club was founded in 1887 and began playing league football in 1890 as founder members of the Scottish Football League. Since their first season Celtic have remained in the top division of the Scottish football league system: the Scottish Football League (1890–93), Scottish Football League Division One (1893–1975), Scottish Football League Premier Division (1975–98), Scottish Premier League (1998–2013) and Scottish Premiership (2013–present). As of 2021–22 the club has completed 133 seasons of competitive football and have been Scottish football champions 52 times.

Celtic played their inaugural league fixture as part of the 1890–91 Scottish Football League on 23 August 1890 against Heart of Midlothian. Since that game they have faced 45 different sides in league football with their most regular opponent having been their Old Firm rivals Rangers, whom they have played on 328 occasions since their first league meeting on 21 March 1891. They met their most recent different league opponent, Ross County, for the first time in the 2012–13 Scottish Premier League season. The club has won 180 of the league matches against Motherwell which represents the most Celtic have won against any club. They have drawn more matches with Rangers than with any other club with 90 of their meetings finishing without a winner. Rangers are also the side that has defeated Celtic in more league games than any other club, having won 126 of their encounters.

Key
 The table includes results of matches played by Celtic in the Scottish Football League, Scottish First Division, Scottish Premier League and Scottish Premiership.
   Teams with this background and symbol in the "Club" column are competing in the 2022–23 Scottish Premiership alongside Celtic.
   Clubs with this background and symbol in the "Club" column are defunct
 P = matches played; W = matches won; D = matches drawn; L = matches lost; F = goals for; A = goals against; Win% = percentage of total matches won
 The columns headed "First" and "Last" contain the first and most recent seasons in which Celtic played league matches against each opponent

All-time league record
Statistics correct as of match played on 5 February 2023.

References

External links
 

League record by opponent
Celtic
Scottish football club statistics